Roman Ulrich Sexl (19 October 1939 – 10 July 1986) was one of the leading Austrian theoretical physicists. He is famous for his textbooks on Special relativity.

Life 

His most cited work is "On the gravitational field of a massless particle" together with Peter C. Aichelburg.
Since 1972 he was professor for Cosmology and General Relativity at the University of Vienna, where, from 1969, he was director of the Institute of Theoretical Physics. From 1971 to 1975 he was the director of the Institute for Space Exploration at the Austrian Academy of Sciences.

In 1980 he received the Robert Wichard-Pohl prize. Today there is the annual Roman-Ulrich-Sexl-Prize for extraordinary achievements in teaching physics.

Publications 
 Relativity (1972)
 Gravitation and Cosmology (1975)
 Relativity, Groups and Particles (1975)

References

External links 
 

1939 births
1986 deaths
Austrian physicists
Cosmologists
Scientists from Vienna
University of Vienna alumni
Academic staff of the University of Vienna